Mashariki Africa Film Festival (MAFF) is a Rwandan-based film event that highlights and awards films by Africans and African diaspora. The first edition of the festival was in 2015.

The event did not hold annually to contain the spread of COVID-19.

2015

2016

2017

2018

2019 

*

2020 
The festival did not hold in 2020 due to the COVID-19 pandemic.

2022 

In 2022, Mashariki African Film Festival was held from 26th November 2022 to 02nd December 2022.

References 

Film festivals in Rwanda